Kolari is a village in the municipality of Smederevo, Serbia. According to the 2002 census, the village has a population of 1196 people.

References

Populated places in Podunavlje District